Quogue is a village in the Town of Southampton in Suffolk County, on the South Fork of Long Island, in New York, United States. As of the 2010 United States Census, the population was 967, down from 1,018 at the 2000 census.

Geography

Demographics

The following demographic information applies to the permanent residents of Quogue and not to summer residents:

As of the census of 2010, there were 967 people and 424 households residing in the village. The population density was 191.2 people per square mile (73.8/km2). There were 1,623 housing units. The racial makeup of the village was 91.83% White, 1.75% African American, 0.2% Native American, 1.03% Asian, 1.96% other races, and 3.2% from two or more races. Hispanic or Latino of any race were 6.38% of the population.

There were 424 households, out of which 164 had children under the age of 18 living with them. 30.2% of all households were made up of individuals, and 13.2% had someone living alone who was 65 years of age or older. The average household size was 2.23 and the average family size was 2.75.

In the village, the population was spread out, with 164 under the age of 18, 34 from 18 to 24, 227 from 25 to 44, 293 from 45 to 64, and 238 who were 65 years of age or older.

Landmarks 
The Quogue Historic District is located within the Village.

Notable people
 Alfred Thayer Mahan, U.S. rear admiral, geopolitician and historian
 Michael Forbes, politician
 Teo Macero, jazz saxophonist, composer, and record producer
 Eli Manning, American football quarterback
 Roger Rosenblatt, writer
 Michael J. Fox, actor
 Jim Cramer, television personality

Gallery

References

External links
 
Official website
Quogue, New York Flags (Flags of the World)

Villages in New York (state)
Villages in Suffolk County, New York
Populated coastal places in New York (state)
Historic districts on the National Register of Historic Places in New York (state)